Photos is a photo management and editing application developed by Apple. It was released as a bundled app in iOS 8 on September 17, 2014—replacing the Camera Roll—and released as a bundled app to OS X Yosemite users in the 10.10.3 update on April 8, 2015. It was released for tvOS 10 on September 13, 2016.

History
In June 2014, Apple announced its plan to discontinue the applications iPhoto and Aperture, to be replaced by a new application, Photos, at some point in 2015. Photos was included with OS X Yosemite 10.10.3, released as a free update to users on April 8, 2015.

On September 13, 2016, the app was later included in tvOS 10.

Features
Photos is intended to be less complex than its professional predecessor, Aperture. Through version 4.0 (released with macOS 10.14 Mojave) the Photos app organized photos by  "moment", as determined using combination of the time and location metadata attached to the photo. Starting in version 5.0 (released in 2019 with macOS 10.15 Catalina), photos can instead be browsed by year, month, or day.

Editing
Photos includes robust editing functions that are utilized with simple controls, such as a one-click auto-enhance button.

iCloud Photo Library
iCloud Photo Library is heavily integrated into the program, keeping photos and videos in sync with various Apple devices designated by the user (such as Macs, iPhones, and iPads), including edits and album structures. Storage starts at a complimentary 5 GB and can be bought in a number of tiers up to 2 TB. While iCloud integration is still optional, it is much more central to Photos as compared to iPhoto.

Professional printing
Like its predecessors, Photos initially included a number of options for professional printing of photos, which could then optionally be turned into books or calendars and mailed to an address. With Photos, Apple added new types of prints, including square sizes and the ability to print panoramas. In July 2018, Apple announced, via a pop-up message in Photos, that they would be discontinuing these services, adding that users should submit any final orders by September 30, 2018.

Sharing
iCloud Photo Sharing allows sharing photos with others. Others can view, like or comment existing shared photos or contribute new photos to the shared album. Other ways of sharing includes e-mail, social platform that integrates through iOS Extensions, or Apple's peer-to-peer AirDrop technology.

Criticism
Critics noted the loss of functionality in Photos as compared to its predecessors. For example, images could no longer be ordered as Events but were either automatically ordered chronologically into Moments or had to be put into albums. The latter did not allow for automatic sorting and it was necessary to configure Smart albums with customized user-defined rules to do so. Customers who had been using the Aperture application, abandoned by Apple on the release of Photos, were particularly angry about loss of professional-standard functionality. Apple customers who upgraded to OS X10.11 El Capitan, which was launched in 2015, found that if they had not first obtained the most recent version of iPhoto before upgrading, they were locked out of the application without warning. Since iPhoto had been removed from the Mac App Store, they had no alternative but to use Photos.

See also 
 Google Photos
 darktable
 gThumb

References

External links 
 
 

Image organizers
Photo software
Raster graphics editors
Apple Inc. software
MacOS graphics software
IOS software
WatchOS software
TvOS software
2014 software
2015 software
IOS
IOS-based software made by Apple Inc.